The First Epistle to the Thessalonians is a Pauline epistle of the New Testament of the Christian Bible.  The epistle is attributed to Paul the Apostle, and is addressed to the church in Thessalonica, in modern-day Greece. It is likely among the first of Paul's letters, probably written by the end of AD 52, though some scholars believe the Epistle to the Galatians may have been written by AD 48.

Background and Audience

Thessalonica is a city on the Thermaic Gulf, which at the time of Paul was within the Roman Empire. Paul visited Thessalonica and preached to the local population, winning converts who became a Christian community. There is debate as to whether or not Paul's converts were originally Jewish. The Acts of the Apostles describes Paul preaching in a Jewish synagogue and persuaded people who were already Jewish that Jesus was the Messiah, but in 1 Thessalonians itself Paul says that the converts had turned from idols, suggesting that they were not Jewish before Paul arrived.

Most New Testament scholars believe Paul wrote this letter from Corinth only months after he left Thessalonica, although information appended to this work in many early manuscripts (e.g., Codices Alexandrinus, Mosquensis, and Angelicus) state that Paul wrote it in Athens after Timothy had returned from Macedonia with news of the state of the church in Thessalonica.

Composition

Date
It is widely agreed that 1 Thessalonians is the first book of the New Testament to be written, and the earliest extant Christian text. A majority of modern New Testament scholars date 1 Thessalonians to 49–51 AD, during Paul's 18-month stay in Corinth coinciding with his second missionary journey. A minority of scholars who do not recognize the historicity of Acts date it in the early 40s AD. The Delphi Inscription dates Gallio's proconsulship of Achaia to 51-52 AD, and Acts 18:12-17 mentions Gallio, toward the end of Paul's stay in Corinth.

1 Thessalonians does not focus on justification by faith or questions of Jewish–Gentile relations, themes that are covered in all other letters. Because of this, some scholars see this as an indication that this letter was written before the Epistle to the Galatians, where Paul's positions on these matters were formed and elucidated.

Authenticity

The majority of New Testament scholars hold 1 Thessalonians to be authentic, although a number of scholars in the mid-19th century contested its authenticity, most notably Clement Schrader and F.C. Baur. 1 Thessalonians matches other accepted Pauline letters, both in style and in content, and its authorship is also affirmed by 2 Thessalonians.

Integrity
The authenticity of 1 Thessalonians 2:13–16 is disputed because its content appears at odds with the surrounding passages and Paul's theology in other epistles. It is also sometimes suggested that 1 Thessalonians 5:1–11 is a post-Pauline insertion that has many features of Lukan language and theology that serves as an apologetic correction to Paul's imminent expectation of the Second Coming in 1 Thessalonians 4:13–18. Some scholars, such as Schmithals, Eckhart, Demke and Munro, have developed complicated theories involving redaction and interpolation in 1 and 2 Thessalonians.

Contents

Outline
 Salutation and thanksgiving
 Past interactions with the church
 Regarding Timothy's visit
 Specific issues within the church
 Relationships among Christians
 Mourning those who have died
 Preparing for God's arrival
 How Christians should behave
 Closing salutation

Text
Paul, speaking for himself, Silas, and Timothy, gives thanks for the news about their faith and love; he reminds them of the kind of life he had lived while he was with them. Paul stresses how honorably he conducted himself, reminding them that he had worked to earn his keep, taking great pains not to burden anyone. He did this, he says, even though he could have used his status as an apostle to impose upon them.

Paul goes on to explain that the dead will be resurrected prior to those still living, and both groups will greet the Lord in the air.

See also
 Authorship of the Pauline epistles
 Imitation of Christ
 Second Epistle to the Thessalonians

Notes

References

External links

 Epistles to the Thessalonians entry in the Catholic Encyclopedia
 Online Bible at GospelHall.org
  Various versions

 
1st-century Christian texts
Thessalonians 1
Pauline epistles
Thessalonians1
Christianity in Thessaloniki
Entering heaven alive